Old Market Square may refer to:

Old Market square, Bydgoszcz, oblong place in old town district of Bydgoszcz, Poland
Old Market Square (Lviv), 12th-century town center in Lviv, Ukraine
Old Market Square, open, pedestrianised city square in Nottingham, England
Old Market Square tram stop, stop of Nottingham Express Transit (NET) in centre of Nottingham
Old Market Square, Potsdam, centrally located square in downtown Potsdam, Germany
Old Market Square, Poznań, centermost neighborhood in Poznań, Poland

See also
Old Market (disambiguation)
Market Square (disambiguation)